Alessandro Scipione, Marquis de Maffei, (3 October 1662, Verona – January 1730, Munich) was an Italian Lieutenant General of Infantry in the service of the Electorate of Bavaria. He was the brother of the Italian writer and archaeologist Francesco Scipione.

Biography
De Maffei was born at Verona. After entering the army of Bavaria in 1683 he was wounded at the Siege of Mongatz in 1687; he was later promoted to Colonel in 1696.

During the War of the Spanish Succession he served as the second in command at the Battle of Schellenberg in 1704. In 1706 he led a brigade at the Battle of Ramillies against the Allied forces under the command of the Duke of Marlborough. After being taken prisoner, he became involved in abortive negotiations for peace.

In 1717 he contributed to the victory over the Turks at the Siege of Belgrade in the Austro-Turkish War and was subsequently made Field Marshal of the Holy Roman Empire. He died in Munich in 1730.

The Maffei family

The Maffei family is of ancient German origin and, more precisely, in the eighth century A.D. derived from the Germanic tribe of the Franks. The surname von Maffei or De Maffei or Maffei is a patronymic name, derived from the personal name Matthäus (German).

Works

References
 
 Crescenzio, Daniela. Italienische Spaziergänge in München. Band 2: Dynastien aus Italien. 1. Auflage. IT-INERARIO, Unterhaching 2009, .
 Falkner, James. Ramillies 1706: Year of Miracles. Pen & Sword Books Ltd, (2006). .
 Fricke, Gustav. Der bayerische Feldmarschall Alessandro Marchese Maffei. Ein Beitrag zur Geschichtsschreibung und zur Geschichte der Türkenkriege und des spanischen Erbfolgekrieges. In: Jahres-Bericht über das Königliche Friedrich-Wilhelms-Gymnasium und die Königliche Vorschule zu Berlin Ostern 1891, pages 3–54.
 

1662 births
1730 deaths
Military personnel from Verona
Italian soldiers
German army commanders in the War of the Spanish Succession